Caladenia dorrigoensis is a plant in the orchid family Orchidaceae and is endemic to New South Wales. It has a single leaf and a single white flower with purple marks on its labellum.

Description
Caladenia dorrigoensis is a terrestrial, perennial, deciduous, herb with an underground tuber and which usually grows in loose groups. The front of the flower is mostly white and the back is covered with brownish or purplish glands. The lateral sepals have similar dimensions to the dorsal sepal but slightly narrower and curved. The lateral lobes of the labellum are erect and surround the column while the central part has six to eight short, purplish-black teeth on each side. The tip of the labellum is curved downward and there are two rows of dark purplish-black, stalked calli along the mid-line of the labellum. Flowering occurs in October.

Taxonomy and naming
Caladenia dorrigoensis was first described in 2016 by David Jones and Lachlan Copeland from a specimen collected in the Dorrigo National Park and the description was published in Australian Orchid Review. The specific epithet (dorrigoensis) refers to the area to which this species seems to be restricted.

Distribution and habitat
This orchid appears to be confined to the a small area in the Dorrigo district where it grows in woodland with a shrubby understorey.

References

dorrigoensis
Plants described in 2016
Endemic orchids of Australia
Orchids of New South Wales
Taxa named by David L. Jones (botanist)
Taxa named by Lachlan Mackenzie Copeland